Little Golden Books is a series of children's books, published since 1942. 

The Poky Little Puppy, the eighth release in the series, is the top-selling children's book of all time in the United States. Many other Little Golden Books have become bestsellers, including Tootle, Scuffy the Tugboat, The Little Red Hen, and Doctor Dan the Bandage Man.

Several of its illustrators later became influential within the children's book industry, including Corinne Malvern, Tibor Gergely, Gustaf Tenggren, Feodor Rojankovsky, Richard Scarry, Eloise Wilkin, and Garth Williams.

Many books in the Little Golden Books series deal with nature, science, Bible stories, nursery rhymes, and fairy tales. Christmas titles are published every year. 

Some Little Golden Books and related products have featured popular characters from other media, such as  Cartoon Network, Disney, Looney Tunes, The Muppets, Sesame Street, Sonic the Hedgehog, Barbie, Power Rangers, Thomas the Tank Engine, and others. 

Film, television, and movie properties have been particularly popular source material. Hopalong Cassidy, Cheyenne, Lassie, Rin Tin Tin, Captain Kangaroo, Mister Rogers, and Donny and Marie Osmond have appeared in Little Golden Books. The line has also published occasional biographies; examples include Betty White, Dolly Parton and Ruth Bader Ginsburg.

The series started with publishing firm Simon & Schuster; Western Printing and Lithographing Company in Racine, Wisconsin was Simon & Schuster's partner in the Little Golden Books venture, with Western handling print operations. Ownership and control of the series have changed several times since; today, Penguin Random House is its current publisher.

Despite changes in detail, the Little Golden Books maintain a distinctive appearance. A copy of The Poky Little Puppy bought today is essentially the same as one printed in 1942. Both are readily recognizable as Little Golden Books. At the time of the series' golden anniversary in 1992, Golden Books claimed that a billion and a half Little Golden Books had been sold.

Although the Little Golden Books have remained the backbone of the product line, the enterprise that produced them has created a variety of children's books in various forms of media, including records, tapes, videos, and toys and games. Some titles have appeared in several different formats (including "A Golden Book").

History

Georges Duplaix, who in 1940 was head of Artists and Writers Guild Inc. (a division of Western Publishing), first came up with this idea when he created new books for children. Meanwhile, a shared printing plant led Western and Simon & Schuster to develop a close relationship. In 1938, Western and Simon & Schuster released their first joint creation, A Children’s History.

Duplaix had the idea to produce a colorful, more durable and affordable children's book than those being published at that time which sold for $2 to $3. With the help of his fellow Guild colleague Lucile Olge, Duplaix contacted Albert Leventhal and Leon Shimkin with his idea (Albert and Leon work for Simon & Schuster, and Albert serves as the company's vice president and sales manager).

The group decided to publish twelve titles for simultaneous release in what was to be called the Little Golden Books Series. Each book would have 42 pages, 28 printed in two-color, and 14 in four-color. The books would be staple-bound. The group first discussed a 50-cent price for the books, but Western did not want to compete with other 50-cent books already on the market. The group calculated that if the print run for each title was 50,000 copies instead of 25,000, the books could affordably sell for 25 cents each.

Mary Reed, Ph.D., a professor at the Teachers College, Columbia University, served as initial editor of the series.

The first 12 titles were printed in September 1942 and released to stores in October:
Three Little Kittens, by Marie Simchow Stern
Bedtime Stories, illus. Gustaf Tenggren
Mother Goose, by Phyllis Fraser, illus. Gertrude E. Espenscheid
Prayers for Children, by Rachel Taft Dixon
The Little Red Hen, illus. Rudolf Freund
Nursery Songs, by Leah Gale, illus. Corinne Malvern
The Alphabet from A to Z, by Leah Gale, illus. Vivienne Blake and Richard Peck
The Poky Little Puppy, by Janette Sebring Lowrey, illus. Gustaf Tenggren
The Golden Book of Fairy Tales, by Winfield Scott Hoskins
Baby's Book of Objects
The Animals of Farmer Jones, by Leah Gale, illus. Richard Scarry
This Little Piggy and Other Counting Rhymes, by Phyllis Cerf Wagner, illus. Roberta Harris Pfafflin Petty

Three editions totaling 1.5 million books sold out within five months of publication in 1942.

Simon & Schuster editor Dorothy A. Bennett also worked with Duplaix on the Little Golden Books. Bennett became the editor of the franchise, producing books by such authors and illustrators as Margaret Wise Brown, Clement Hurd, Edith Thacher Hurd, and Garth Williams. Bennett authored several Golden Books, and introduced some of the first recorded books for children with Little Golden Records in 1948.

The series underwent an expansion when Lucy Sprague Mitchell (educator and founder of Bank Street Nursery School now Bank Street College of Education) joined. A strong supporter of realistic children's literature, Mitchell created the Bank Street Writer's Laboratory. Works coming from this institution became the new basis for the Little Golden Book series, with characters and situations often inspired by the very locale of the Bank School.

As historian Leonard S. Marcus writes:

In 1958, Simon & Schuster sold its interest in Little Golden Books to Western Publishing. The price of Little Golden Books rose to 29¢ in 1962.

Western introduced a line of Big Little Golden Books for slightly older children aged five and up. Some titles from this series range from brand new stories (such as The House That Had Enough) to reprints (such as The Monster at the End of This Book).

In the 1980s, Golden Books introduced Golden Melody Books. Titles from this series included a long-lasting electronic chip that played music when readers open those books. Songs featured in this series range from popular children's songs such as Twinkle, Twinkle Little Star, to songs from children's TV and family movies including People in Your Neighborhood from Sesame Street and Heigh-Ho from Disney's Snow White and the Seven Dwarfs.

In the year 2000, Encore Software produced a series of "Little Golden Books" titles for CD ROM, including The Poky Little Puppy, Mother Goose, Jack and the Beanstalk, The Velveteen Rabbit, Tootle, and The Saggy Baggy Elephant.  These six individual titles were some of the first major software releases to be produced entirely in Macromedia Flash. 

In 2001, Random House acquired Little Golden Books for about $85 million. At that point, nearly 15 million copies of  The Poky Little Puppy had been sold, including copies in various languages.

In 2015, with the release of Little Golden Book adaptations of the first six installments of the Star Wars saga on August 25, the Little Golden Book adaptation of Star Wars: Episode III – Revenge of the Sith became the first-ever Little Golden Book in history to come from a film that was rated PG-13 by the MPAA. Months later, on April 12, 2016, a Little Golden Book adaptation of Star Wars: The Force Awakens, the next film in the saga, also rated PG-13, was released. This release opened the door for further Little Golden Books that drew upon PG-13 rated licensed film properties; some adaptations in this criteria include the 2016 reboot of Ghostbusters, characters and storylines from the Marvel Cinematic Universe, and Jurassic Park.

Writers and illustrators 
Many popular authors and illustrators have worked on Little Golden Books and related products, including:

In popular culture

Contemporary art

In 2010, Ryan Jude Novelline revealed the "Golden Book Gown", a "one-of-a-kind fairytale-inspired gown almost entirely from Golden Books...[featuring] a 22,000-square-inch page-turning skirt and a form-fitting bodice made from the spines".

Homages
In 2015, during the Diamond celebration at Disneyland, the Disney Imagineers went to bring the Little Golden Book story, Little Man at Disneyland from 1955 to life by featuring a recreation of Patrick Begorra's home in a tree trunk somewhere in Adventureland at the park if visitors were to keep an eye out for it.

See also

 Everything I Need To Know I Learned From A Little Golden Book
 Golden Book Encyclopedia
 Little Golden Book Land
 Poky and Friends

References

Sources consulted 
 "A Birthday Celebration for Golden Books..." Publishers' Weekly. 221(15):24. April 9, 1982.
 "Simon & Schuster Inc." International Directory of Company Histories.  4:671-672. 1991.
 Greason, Rebecca. Tomart's Price Guide to Golden Book Collectibles. Radnor, PA:  Wallace-Homestead Book Company, 1991.
 Santi, Steve. Collecting Little Golden Books: a Collector's Identification and Price Guide, 3rd Edition. Iola, WI:  Krause Publications, 1998.
 Marcus, Leonard S.  Golden Legacy: How Golden Books Won Children's Hearts, Changed Publishing Forever, and Became An American Icon Along the Way.  New York: Golden Books, 2007.

Notes

External links
 Penguin Random House Series Little Golden Book website

 
Book series introduced in 1942
Series of children's books
Early childhood education
Early childhood education in the United States
.
Penguin Random House
Universal Pictures franchises
Bertelsmann franchises
Western Publishing